Burn-Up Scramble is a 2004 12-episode anime television series directed by Hiroki Hayashi. Though the basic premise is in keeping with its predecessors Burn Up! and Burn-Up Excess it is an entirely new series with some new and some old characters, and a very different art style.

Like Burn-Up W and Burn-Up Excess, the series centers on a busty police officer and martial artist name Rio Kinezono, leader of the super-secret squad known as Warriors. She just wants to find love in her life... so much so that she often changes around her living arrangements just to attract the right man.  So far, the only man she was able to attract is her perverted superior, Yuji Naruo... and he's being protected by Matsuri Tamagawa, his overly-zealous girlfriend. Her Warriors teammates are Maya Jingu, a quiet girl but an extreme gun-nut, and Lilica Evett, a shy and insecure telepath.

In this series, Rio Kinezono is more interested in pursuing romance than fashion as in the earlier series. Her martial arts abilities are enhanced and she is even able to dodge bullets fired at her. The Maya Jingu character design is changed quite a bit, she has longer hair, shorter and less well endowed. Lilica Evette is a shy, insecure, and slightly clumsy psychic rather than the cheerfully energetic computer and tech expert. Yuji Naruo is now Head Chief rather than a fellow officer and driver, and continually makes inappropriate romantic overtures to Rio Kinezono instead of just being obsessed with seeing the girls in their underwear. The unnamed Commander is not involved in Warrior activities and has a more minor role than Maki the commander in the earlier series.

Plot
Set in AD. 2023, Tokyo the government is concerned about the increase in major criminal organizations, terrorists and other threats to the security of society. This leads to the formation of special extralegal police team from within the Metro Police Section 8 Branch called Warrior. Under their Commander, the team combines the talents of martial arts expert Rio Kinezono and skilled marksman and gun expert Maya Jingu. They are joined later by the shy Lilica Evette who uses her psychic powers to assist them in their crime-solving adventures. Later, the Police Council create obedient New Warriors to replace the original Warriors. These New Warriors are genetically modified humans with superhuman strength gained via drugs and based on data obtained from monitoring Rio and Maya's missions.

Characters 
Although many of the characters in Burn Up Scramble share the same names as characters from Burn Up W and Burn Up Excess, they have undergone various changes in terms of art design, personality, and plot.

 Rio Kinezono
 
 Rio is the volatile leader of the Warriors, blond and large breasted. Rio is just as good at physical combat as her previous incarnation and is now able to dodge bullets. She is the character that most resembles her counterpart from W and Excess. She bears very similar character designs and personality traits, however now she is more driven to seek a happy love life than her previous obsessions with fashion and spending in the earlier series.

 Maya Jingu
 
 Maya  is an expert marksmen but is more softly spoken and level-headed than in the earlier series. Visually, her character design has changed quite a bit; she now has long dark hair woven in a plait and is less well endowed.

 Lilica Evette
 
 Lilica is a shy, insecure, and slightly clumsy psychic, but when she gets drunk, she becomes more uninhibited and somewhat daffy. She looks up to Rio, addressing her with the honorific 'senpai'. Because of the possible danger her powers present, Lilica is outfitted with magnetic wrist and ankle restraints.  Her character is the most changed from her previous version. The new Lilica is around the same height as Rio, has a figure to match, short orange hair and a tanned complexion while the previous Lilica was shorter, flat-chested and sported pink hair.

 Warriors Commander
 
 The unnamed Commander is the creator and commander of the Warriors.  She answers to the Central Police Council, and gathers Rio, Maya and Lilica to form the Warriors and hands out their assignments.

 Yuji Naruo
 
 Yuji holds the rank of Head Chief in the Metro Police Section 8 Branch. He is portrayed as a smart, well educated officer from a wealthy family and obsessively pursues Rio romantically, even at work. In the previous series he was a low-level perverted policemen. He still serves as comic relief in the series.

 Matsuri Tamagawa
 
 Matsuri is Yuji's current girlfriend, and a police officer as well. While she is oblivious to Yuji's attentions to Rio, she perceives  Rio as a threat to her marrying Yuji in the future. She is constantly threatening Rio to staying away from him, oblivious to the fact that Rio is not interested in Yuji.

 New Warriors
 The New Warriors are genetically modified women with superhuman strength gained via drugs and their skills are based on data obtained by monitoring Rio and Maya's earlier missions. They were created in a collaboration between the Central Police Council and criminals, using illegal human experiments and funding.

Episodes

Release

Reception

Burn Up Scramble was quite a departure in visual style, character design and plot from the Burn Up W and Burn Up Excess anime. The computer-aided production came in for some criticism in the Anime News Network  DVD review  which suggested that it gave "the staff new ways of coming up with lazy shortcuts. ...the key frames and poses look loaded with energy but they're strung together by awkward motions that don't look like fighting at all."

See also
 Burn-Up!
 Burn-Up W
 Burn-Up Excess

References

External links
AIC page
Geneon Entertainment page

2004 anime television series debuts
Action anime and manga
Anime International Company
Comedy anime and manga
Geneon USA
NBCUniversal Entertainment Japan
Science fiction anime and manga